Zakaria Paliashvili Street is a street of Tbilisi and is named after the Georgian composer Zacharia Paliashvili. The street is located on the right bank of the Kura River in the Vake district of Tbilisi, from Korneli Kekelidze Street to Archil Mishveladze Street.   
Paliashvili street originated in the 1920s.  Formerly it was called Vake Street, according to the 1926 reference of Tbilisi - Vake Avenue.  In he 1925-1926 reference book "All of Tiflis" , the street is included in the list of new streets in Vake.  It was named after Zacharia Paliashvili in the 1930s.  Alexander Tvalchrelidze Caucasus Mineral Resources Institute is on the street.  There is a monument of Konstantine Gamsakhurdia in the square of the same name (sculptor - Tengiz Kikalishvili, architect - Tamaz Tevzadze).

External Links

Bibliography
 "Tbilisi. Streets, avenues, squares" (ენციკლოპედია «თბილისი. ქუჩები, გამზირები, მოედნები»), pg. 175, Tbilisi, 2008.

References

Streets in Tbilisi
Vake District
Vake, Tbilisi